Bak Kandi (also Romanized as Bak Kandī and Bakandī; also known as Beg Kandī, Beyg Kandī, and Bikandi) is a village in Ilat-e Qaqazan-e Gharbi Rural District, Kuhin District, Qazvin County, Qazvin Province, Iran. At the 2006 census, its population was 1,446, in 362 families.

References 

Populated places in Qazvin County